Joshua Mercer Goar (January 31, 1870 – April 4, 1947), was an American professional baseball player who was a pitcher in the National League in 1896 and 1898.

Biography
Goar pitched in four major league games; three games for the Pittsburgh Pirates in 1896 and one game for the Cincinnati Reds in 1898, all in relief. In a total of  innings pitched, he allowed 40 hits and 36 runs while striking out three batters and walking nine batters. As a batter, he had one hit in six at bats for a .167 batting average.

Minor league records, incomplete for the era, list Goar as playing in the Western League during 1895–1897, and for the Indianapolis Hoosiers in 1900.

Goar is noted for an unusual inning pitched when playing for the minor-league Anderson Tigers in the Indiana State League. On May 30, 1890, he reportedly allowed six hits (three triples, one double, and two singles) in a single inning without a run scoring. The unusual sequence of events included two runners being tagged out at the plate, and the final out coming when a batted ball hit a baserunner (which officially credits the batter with a hit).

Born in New Lisbon, Indiana, in 1870, Goar died in 1947 in New Castle, Indiana. He was survived by his wife and two daughters.

References

External links

1870 births
1947 deaths
People from Henry County, Indiana
Baseball players from Indiana
Major League Baseball pitchers
Pittsburgh Pirates players
Cincinnati Reds players
19th-century baseball players
Anderson Tigers players
Toledo Swamp Angels players
Terre Haute Hottentots players
Grand Rapids Rippers players
Grand Rapids Gold Bugs players
Indianapolis Indians players
Indianapolis Hoosiers (minor league) players